Kongoti is a village in Ivory Coast. It is in the sub-prefecture of Anoumaba, M'Batto Department, Moronou Region, Lacs District.

Kongoti was a commune until March 2012, when it became one of 1126 communes nationwide that were abolished.

Notes

Former communes of Ivory Coast
Populated places in Lacs District
Populated places in Moronou Region